The Mercedes-Benz OM906 or Mitsubishi 6S20 is a 6.4 liter (6,374cc) Straight-6 (I6) OHV Diesel engine with 3 valves per cylinder. It is related to the Straight-4 OM904 engine which has two cylinders chopped off, while the bore and stroke remain unchanged.

It launched in 1996 and had a Unit injector system to deliver fuel to every cylinder. It used a twin-scroll Turbocharger that was giving ~1-1.6atm of boost.

This engine is also used by Mitsubishi Fuso as 6S20, installed on Mitsubishi Fuso FJ series which is in turn a rebadged version of Mercedes Benz Axor produced by Bharatbenz in India.

Torque Curve

See also 

 List of Mercedes-Benz engines

References 

OM906